Kora is a New Zealand music group, which originally consisted of four brothers from the Kora family.  The band, which began in Whakatane, New Zealand fuses elements of reggae, rock, dub, roots, funk, and more recently space funk and dub step elements.

Members
Current members
Francis Kora (bass guitar/vocals)
Stuart Kora (guitar/vocals)
Dan McGruer (bass guitar/keys/effects) 
Richie Allan (guitars)
Darren Mathiassen (drums)
Marika Hodgson (bass)
Karlos Tunks (guitar)

Former members
Brad Kora (drums/vocals)
Laughton Kora (guitar/vocals)

Discography

Studio albums
Kora (2007)
Light Years (2012)

EPs
Volume (2004)

Singles
L-OVER (2021)
Weekend (DJ Spell Remix) (2021)
Weekend (2020)
Secret Lover (P-Money House Mix) (2020)
Secret Lover (2020)
Carolina (2016)

Awards
2008 – Nominated for NZVMA Best Roots Album (Kora) 
2013 – Nominated for NZVMA Highest Selling NZ Album (Light Years)

References

https://aotearoamusicawards.nz/award-history/

New Zealand reggae musical groups
Musical groups established in 1991
Whakatāne
1991 establishments in New Zealand
Pacific reggae